Stade de Saint-Jean is a multi-purpose stadium in the Saint-Jean quarter of Saint Barthélemy, an overseas collectivity of France in the Caribbean. It is the only stadium on the island and currently hosts matches of local rugby teams and the Saint Barthélemy national football team.

History
The stadium was originally constructed sometime before 1979 and regularly had poor soil and grass conditions. In 2010, Roman Abramovich, Russian billionaire and owner of Chelsea F.C., purchased personal property on the island and donated a reported 3 million euros to renovate the stadium.  The renovation included the installation of artificial turf and an athletic track.  Shortly after completion, the stadium was inaugurated with a celebrity football match which included former professionals Robert Pires and José Touré and formula one racer Paul Belmondo.

The reconstruction of the stadium and addition of an adjacent resort for visiting teams allowed the Saint Barthélemy national football team to play its first home match in 2010 against Saint Martin. These upgrades were again paid for by Abramovich following Hurricane Irma.

References

National stadiums
Saint Barthélemy national football team
Sports venues in Saint Barthélemy